HO is a 2002 Indian Kannada-Tamil bilingual film directed by debutants N. Lokanath and Rajaram.  The film's script was written by Upendra who stars in the lead role with Prabhu Deva, Priyanka Trivedi along with Babu Mohan, Sadhu Kokila and Bank Janardhan portraying supporting roles. The film was dubbed in Tamil as HO Kaveri and was produced by Dhanraj under Dhanraj Films.

The film's plot revolves around the fight between two villages, as the Kaveri water issue became controversial upon its release and did well at box office. The film's cinematography and editing were handled by H. C. Venugopal and T. Shashikumar respectively. The film was dubbed in Telugu under the same name and it was dubbed into Hindi as Dil Ki Dhadkan. The core concept of using the dispute between two states as a metaphorical reference in the story went on to inspire a similar attempt in the 2016 Marathi movie Marathi Tigers.

Cast
 Upendra as Udayashankar
 Prabhudeva as Vairamuthu
 Priyanka Upendra
 Babu Mohan
 Sadhu Kokila
 Bank Janardhan
 Ravindranath
 Shankar Bhat
 Pushpa Swamy
 Mandapanda Aiyappa as King, heroine's father in past life

Production
The film's script was initially written in 1998 for Dr. Rajkumar and Rajinikanth, who both refused to do the film due to the sensitive nature of the film.

Soundtrack
Sadhu Kokila composed the music for the film. The lyrics were written by Upendra. The soundtrack album was released on 27 May 2001 at Kanteerava Studios, Bangalore.

Reception
HO was Upendra's return to the big screen after a hiatus of 2 years. Upon its audio release, a record number of audio cassettes and CDs were sold. The film created a new record and went on to do a business of more than 1 crore through audio sales. Soundtrack numbers like "I Wanna See My Darling", "Hoove Hoove", "Naa Ninna Bidalare", "Bida Byada", and "Dil Ilde" went on to top the charts.

Themes
H2o is a triangular love story between a Kannadiga and a Tamilian vying for the love of a girl called "Kaveri", it is actually a metaphorical reference for the river Cauvery dispute between Karnataka and Tamil Nadu. Upendra noted that he compared the issue to Siamese twins "tried to communicate that harmonious living is the only suitable solution to the Cauvery dispute, rather than fighting over it." The river Kaveri which is a subject  matter of dispute between two states of Karnataka and Tamil Nadu being used as a metaphorical reference in the movie by naming the heroine as "Kaveri" and making the two lead heroes belonging to these two states went on to inspire the 2016 Marathi movie Marathi Tigers which was a triangular love story between two lead heroes belonging to Maharashtra and Karnataka vying for the love of a girl called "Seema" (literally meaning border) - thereby referring to the border dispute between these two states.

Release

Controversy
The film became controversial due to its content as the activists from Karnataka and Tamil Nadu demanded the film to be banned. Upendra was forced to compromise by dubbing Tamil dialogues in the film into Kannada and vice versa, to appease linguistics sentiments on both sides. Scenes containing flags of political parties were deleted, before its re-release.

Critical reception
The film received highly positive reviews upon release. Critics applauded the way Upendra had managed to narrate a sensitive matter like the Kaveri River water dispute in a commercial way.

Box-office performance
HO completed 50 days of run in 28 theatres across Karnataka and also went on to complete 75 days of run in Bangalore, despite controversies and release in excessive number of theatres playing spoilsport. HO was a 'Semi Hit' at the box office. Although a commercial success, it turned out to be the least running film of Upendra till then in terms of long run by completing only 75 days of run. This was very less compared to his previous films like A (1998), Upendra (1999), Preethse (2000), all of which had completed more than 175 days of run. Unlike other Upendra films of that time, HO could not get a long run at the box office mainly due to negative controversies and temporary ban on the film.

However, irrespective of its under-performance, the distributors and exhibitors made huge business from HO. Even though the distributors of HO earned huge profits and the film's collections were on par with other hit films of that time, it was termed as a flop by the media because of the film not reaching expectations. Producer Dhanraj went on a strike against Upendra demanding free call-sheet from him, stating that he had suffered huge losses from the movie.

However, HO continues to remain in the 'Hit' status among some section of the media and box office analysts. Rajaram, one of the directors of the film, mentioned in an interview that "HO had a successful run at the box office, although the product couldn't reach the mass properly baked, for so many other reasons". In an interview with TV9 in 2011, Upendra denied that HO was a failure. According to Upendra, the film got extra ordinary openings and collections at the box office, but could not get a long run beyond 75 days due to excessive release, mass distribution and controversies playing spoilsport. Upendra explained that a major chunk of HO'''s profits went to the distributors and exhibitors instead of the producer due to mass distribution and flawed marketing by the producer.

The core-concept of the movie was re-used in the controversial 2016 Marathi movie Marathi Tigers - which incidentally was a triangular love story between a Marathi and a Kannadiga vying for the love of a girl called Seema (which literally means border'')- thereby metaphorically referring the border dispute between Maharashtra and Karnataka.

References

External links

2000s Kannada-language films
2002 films
Kaveri River
2002 directorial debut films
Kannada films remade in other languages